This table displays the top-rated primetime television series of the 1995–96 season as measured by Nielsen Media Research.

References

1995 in American television
1996 in American television
1995-related lists
1996-related lists
Lists of American television series